The South American Youth Championship 1992 was held in Medellín, Colombia. It also served as qualification for the 1993 FIFA World Youth Championship.

Teams
The following teams entered the tournament:

 
 
 
  (host)
 
 
 
 
(Argentina were banned by the FIFA due to misbehaviour at the previous World Youth Championship)

First round

Group A

Group B

Final round

Qualification to World Youth Championship
The three best performing teams qualified for the 1993 FIFA World Youth Championship.

External links
Results by RSSSF

South American Youth Championship
1992 in Colombian football
1992 in multi-sport events
1992 in youth association football